The Defense Acquisition University (DAU) is a corporate university of the United States Department of Defense offering "acquisition, technology, and logistics" (AT&L) training to military and Federal civilian staff and Federal contractors. DAU is headquartered in Fort Belvoir, Virginia, and is accredited by the American Council on Education (ACE), International Association for Continuing Education and Training (IACET) and the Council on Occupational Education (COE).

History
The University Charter was created in October 1991 by Department of Defense (DoD) Directive 5000.57. Originally a loose consortium of existing training commands, DAU worked to standardize the training courses and establish mechanisms that allowed for centralized management of training funds for the DoD workforce.

In the late 1990s, the consortium arrangement was replaced by a centralized structure, more like that of a corporate university. By 2014, DAU had grown to the point of graduating 181,970 students.

Leadership
DAU was headed by a Commandant until the year 2000 when it became a civilian institution, and since then the chief executive position has the title "President." DAU's Commandants and Presidents have included William L. Vincent (1991-1993), Claude M. Bolton (1993–1996), Richard A. Black (1996–1997), Leonard Vincent (1997–1999), Frank J. Anderson (1999-2010), Katrina McFarland (2011-2012), and James P. Woolsey (2013–present).

Locations

DAU is headquartered at Fort Belvoir, Virginia, and serves approximately 150,000 members of the defense acquisition workforce in all. DAU also has several other locations across the United States as well an online presence. These locations include:
 DAU Capital and Northeast, located at Fort Belvoir with access and services to The Pentagon and Washington Department of Defense agencies. It serves an AT&L workforce of about 35,000 people.
 Defense Systems Management College, located near the Capital and Northeast Region campus
 DAU Mid-Atlantic, located in California, Maryland (near the Patuxent River Naval Air Station)
 DAU South, in Huntsville, Alabama (just outside Redstone Arsenal), serving 41,000+ members
 DAU Midwest, located in Kettering, Ohio (just outside Wright-Patterson Air Force Base), serving 25,000+ members
 DAU West in San Diego, serving 30,013 people (as of 2021)
 Various satellite locations at major military commands

Admissions and costs
Applicants must have a current affiliation with the United States government in order to attend training courses offered by DAU. The United States Military Services and the DoD have internal registration and quotas for DAU class, while the Federal Acquisition Institute (FAI) accepts applications and registers most non-DoD students.

U.S. Federal employees and defense contractors may attend DAU courses at no cost when space is available. DAU charges tuition only to certain foreign students.

Training and certificates

The Defense Acquisition Workforce Improvement Act (DAWIA) requires Defense Acquisition Workforce members to be certified for the positions they hold. DAU offers training courses for all Defense Acquisition Workforce members in 7 functional areas and at three certification levels.

Functional Areas:
 Auditing
 Business: 
 Financial Management
 Cost Estimating
 Contracting
 Engineering and Technical Management
 Life Cycle Logistics
 Program Management
 Test and Evaluation

The American Council on Education (ACE) assigns ACE credits to various DAU courses. DAU coursework can apply toward college and university degrees and certificates at some partner institutions.

Defense Acquisition Guide
The Defense Acquisition Guidebook (DAG) is a text developed to aid in the understanding and implementation of United States Department of Defense Acquisition practices under the DoD Directive 5000 series.  This text, also available in web-accessed electronic format and web-structured HTML basis (see https://aaf.dau.edu/guidebooks/) provides insight to a life cycle view and functional roles within the lifecycle of acquisitions.

In 2002 the DOD 5000.2-R became the Interim Defense Acquisition Guidebook.

Mission assistance
DAU instructors are available to consult and assist acquisition organizations in the design and review of processes and internal training when they are not teaching. They can also provide workshops and specific topic instruction in areas of interest or concern tailored to a specific organization.

Hacking incident
In July 2011 a hacking incident occurred affecting DAU's Web-based training site. This incident occurred on a vendor's network that provided the learning management system's underlying source code and inhibited access to online courses for almost two months. While DAU was not hacked, U.S. Cyber Command (U.S. CYBERCOM) evaluated the risk level to DAU's system based on the incident that occurred on the vendor's network, and temporarily suspended online training courses to secure the system and protect students' personal information.

See also
 Military acquisition
 Joint Capabilities Integration Development System
 Federal Acquisition Regulation

References

External links 
 Defense Acquisition Guidebook, 28 June 2013 PDFs 
 Defense Acquisition Guidebook, 16 September 2013 PDF
 Defense Acquisition Guidebook, Feb 2017 PDF
 Defense Acquisition Guidebook (DAG) html format at Defense Acquisition University
 DoD Directive 5000.01 
 DoD Instruction 5000.02
 Recent Policy and Guides  at Defense Acquisition University
 Acquisition Community Center page  at Defense Acquisition University

United States defense procurement
Military education and training in the United States
Educational institutions established in 1991
Universities and colleges accredited by the Council on Occupational Education
1991 establishments in Virginia